Ernst & Young Global Limited, trade name EY, is a multinational professional services partnership headquartered in London, England.  EY is one of the largest professional services networks in the world. Along with Deloitte, KPMG and PricewaterhouseCoopers (PwC), it is considered one of the Big Four accounting firms. It primarily provides assurance (which includes financial audit), tax, consulting and advisory services to its clients. Like many of the larger accounting firms in recent years, EY has expanded into markets adjacent to accounting, including strategy, operations, HR, technology, and financial services consulting.

EY operates as a network of member firms which are structured as separate legal entities in a partnership, which has 312,250 employees in over 700 offices in more than 150 countries around the world. The firm's current partnership was formed in 1989 by a merger of two accounting firms; Ernst & Whinney and Arthur Young & Co. It was named Ernst & Young until a rebranding campaign officially changed its name to EY in 2013, although this initialism was already used informally prior to its sanctioning adoption.

In 2019, EY was the seventh-largest privately owned organization in the United States. EY has continuously been ranked on Fortune magazine's list of the 100 Best Companies to Work For for the past 24 years, longer than any other accounting firm.

History

Early history and mergers 
That same year, this firm was joined by an accountant named Frederick Whinney, who, a decade later, became a partner. After his son joined the firm, it was later renamed Whinney, Smith & Whinney, in 1894.

In 1903, the firm Ernst & Ernst was founded in Cleveland, Ohio, by Alwin C. Ernst, and his brother, Theodore Ernst. In 1906, Arthur Young & Co.  was set up by a Scottish accountant, Arthur Young, in Chicago. Starting in 1924, these two American firms became allied with prominent British firms; Young with Broads Paterson & Co.; and Ernst with the aforementioned Whinney Smith & Whinney. The latter of these two mergers spawned Anglo-American partnership Ernst & Whinney in 1979, then the fourth largest accountancy firm in the world.

A decade later, in 1989, Ernst & Whinney merged with the fifth largest firm globally at the time, Arthur Young & Co., to create Ernst & Young.

Later developments 

In October 1997, Ernst & Young announced plans to merge its global practices with professional services network KPMG, to create the largest professional services organization in the world. The announcement came on the heels of an announced merger between Price Waterhouse and Coopers & Lybrand only a month earlier. These plans were soon abandoned in February 1998, due to several factors ranging from client opposition, antitrust issues, cost problems, and the anticipated difficulty of merging the two diverse firms and cultures. The merger between Price Waterhouse and Coopers & Lybrand, however, went ahead as planned, creating PricewaterhouseCoopers.

Ernst & Young expanded its consulting practice heavily during the 1980s and 1990s. During this time, the U.S. Securities and Exchange Commission, and various members of the investment community, began to raise concerns about a potential conflict of interests. This conflict would be brought about by firms offering both consulting and auditing services simultaneously to overlapping clients, a common practice among the "Big Five". In May 2000, Ernst & Young was the first of those firms to fully separate its consulting practices via a sale to the French IT services company Capgemini for $11 billion, creating the new company Capgemini Ernst & Young, which was later renamed back to Capgemini.

Recent history, re-branding and expansion 

In 2002, Ernst & Young serviced a large chunk of the clients previously working with Arthur Andersen after their downfall in connection with the Enron scandal, although it did not engage with any new Arthur Andersen clients from the United Kingdom, China, or the Netherlands. Four years later, Ernst & Young became the only member of the Big Four to have two member firms in the United States, with the inclusion of Mitchell & Titus, LLP in 2006, the largest minority-owned accounting firm in the United States. Mitchell & Titus ended its membership in the EY network effective October 30, 2015.

In April 2009, Reuters reported that Ernst & Young, spurred by the global economic downturn, had launched a cost-saving initiative encouraging its staff in China to take 40 days of low-pay leave between the summer of 2009 and the summer of 2010. Those who participated got a prorated salary equal to 20% of a regular salary, plus the benefits of a full-time employee. The initiative applied to employees in Hong Kong, Macau and mainland China, where the firm's employees numbered 8,500 in total. In 2010, Ernst & Young acquired Terco, the Brazilian member firm of Grant Thornton.

In 2013, the firm officially changed its brand from Ernst & Young to EY, and christened the accompanying tagline: "Building a better working world".

Also in 2013, the Pope of the Roman Catholic church hired EY to help review Vatican City State's finances and help "verify and consult" the institution's administration, including the museums, post office and tax-free department store. EY expanded further and acquired all of KPMG Denmark's operations including its 150 partners, 1500 employees and 21 offices.

In 2014, EY acquired global strategy consulting firm The Parthenon Group, gaining 350 consultants in its then-Transaction Advisory Services practice so that it could provide in-house strategy consulting services to its clients. The business unit has since been rebranded as EY-Parthenon and is one of the most selective strategy consultancies worldwide.

In 2015, EY opened its first global Security Operations Centre in Thiruvananthapuram, Kerala in India, and coincidentally invested $20 million over 5 years to combat the increasing threat of cybercrimes.

In 2017 EY announced it was opening an executive support center in Tucson, AZ, USA, creating 125 new jobs. That same year, the company opened a Digital Security Operations Center, located in Muscat, Oman, to cover the EMEIA region as part of a $10 million investment.

In 2018, EY opened a $4.4 million professional services center in Louisville, KY, USA, creating 125 new jobs, and announced it would open an IT / tech hub in Nashville, TN, USA, creating 600 regional jobs. 

In November 2022, it was announced EY had acquired the Sydney-headquartered data and analytics specialists, Bridge Business Consulting.

Project Everest

The Wall Street Journal reported in May 2022 that the firm might split its accounting and advisory divisions into two new, separate businesses. The plan, referred to internally as "Project Everest" would involve the consulting business completing an initial public offering, the proceeds of which would be used to compensate partners at the new, separate auditing company. The firm's debt has proven to be an internal obstacle to the split. The debt is mostly owed to former partners of EY, taking the form of what the Wall Street Journal characterized as "effectively an unfunded pension plan". Would-be partners of the new accounting firm have expressed reservations as their descendant firm, the smaller of the new organizations, would presumably absorb most of the debt. On 5 September 2022, the firm announced that partners would vote on whether to split EY into two businesses. EY's member firms in China, Hong Kong, Macau, and Israel stated that they would not split. Rival firms such as KPMG and Deloitte have said they do not intend to imitate EY.

In March 2023, Julie Bowland, head of EY US, stated in a webcast that the split would be temporarily paused amid internal debate over the proportioning of its tax service line among the proposed consulting and assurance spinoffs.

Global structure 
The firm is organized geographically into three areas: Europe, Middle East, India and Africa; the Americas; and Asia-Pacific.

In 2018, the company underwent a transformation of some of its region borders, primarily a unification of its CIS region (operating in the former Soviet Union) and the CEE region (Eastern Europe) to create the CESA block.

Services
Over the course of its operations, EY has transformed its business model and diversified its pool of offered services. Over the course of the last decade EY has substantially altered its business approach to offer a more comprehensive scope of services. This is mainly attributed to an intensified competition in the existing market of professional services, and competition in new markets: investment banking and strategic consultancy. According to the latest published data, the company has the following four main service lines:
 Assurance: comprises Financial Audit, Financial Accounting Advisory Services, CCaSS (Climate Change and Sustainability services) and Forensic & Integrity Services.
 Tax: Transfer Pricing, International Tax Services, Business Tax Compliance, Global Trade, Indirect Tax, Tax Accounting & Risk Advisory Services, Tax Technology and Transformation, Transaction Tax.
 Consulting: comprises three sub-service lines – Business Consulting, Technology Consulting, and People Advisory Services.
 Strategy and Transactions or SaT: deals with companies' capital transformation – including Business Valuation and Economics, Due Diligence, Real Estate Advisory, M&A, Restructuring (financial and operational), Corporate Finance Strategy.

Accounting scandals

Audit practices
EY has been involved in many accounting scandals: Bank of Credit and Commerce International (1991), Informix Corporation (1996), Sybase (1997), Cendant (1998), One.Tel (2001), AOL (2002), HealthSouth Corporation (2003), Chiquita Brands International (2004), Lehman Brothers (2010), Sino-Forest Corporation (2011), Olympus Corporation (2011), Stagecoach Group (2017), Wirecard (2020), Luckin Coffee (2020) and NMC Health (2020).

In 2004, Ernst & Young was punished for forming a lucrative business arrangement with one of its audit clients, PeopleSoft, thus creating a conflict of interest. As a result, the firm was barred by the SEC from accepting any new publicly traded companies as audit clients for six months.

In April 2004, Equitable Life, a UK life assurance company, sued EY after nearly collapsing but abandoned the case in September 2005. EY described the case as "a scandalous waste of time, money and resources for all concerned."

In 2009, EY, the former auditors of Sons of Gwalia, agreed to a $125m settlement over their role in the gold miner's collapse in 2004. Ferrier Hodgson, the company's administrator, had claimed EY was negligent over the accounting of gold and dollar hedging contracts. However, EY said that the proposed settlement was not an admission of any liability.

Following allegations by the Securities and Exchange Commission (SEC) that EY had committed accounting fraud in its work auditing the books of Bally Total Fitness, EY reached two settlements in 2008, including a fine of $8.5 million.

EY Hong Kong resigned from the audit of Standard Water on when it emerged that although EY Hong Kong had signed off the audit, it had been effectively outsourced to the affiliate in mainland China, which had received 99.98% of the fee. This was important because shareholders have less confidence in mainland auditors and because audit papers on the mainland are subject to state secrecy laws and can be withheld from outside regulators. EY's quality and risk management leader (Greater China) even testified in the Court of First Instance that he was not sure whether there was a formal agreement covering the relationship between the two EY entities. The court case in 2013 came as US regulators were taking an interest in similar cases of accounting fraud in mainland China.

In September 2016, the US securities regulatory SEC fined EY US US$9.3 million for failures, including an auditor’s romantic involvement with a client.  Another partner on the team who was auditing a different public company became romantically involved with its chief accounting officer.

In October 2016, EY settled with the SEC because they were unable to detect financial statement fraud that was committed by the Weatherford tax department. Weatherford misstated their financial statements by manipulating the income tax line item in their financials. EY was Weatherford's independent auditors when the fraud was perpetrated.

In October 2016, Mozilla stopped accepting WebTrust audits from Ernst & Young Hong Kong due to their failure "to detect multiple issues they should have detected" during their audits of WoSign.

In February 2017, in response to questions regarding misissued certificates, Symantec stated they would no longer accept WebTrust audits from E&Y Korea and E&Y Brazil due to deficiencies in these audits.

According to The Wall Street Journal, in 2019, EY had audited WeWork the office-space company that "nearly collapsed after fumbling a planned initial public offering".

In April 2020, a former partner and whistleblower was awarded $10.8 million for ethical misconduct by EY in a Dubai gold audit by the high court in London. EY appealed the decision, but then dropped the appeal in March 2021.

In 2020, EY failed to uncover $2 billion that was missing at Wirecard AG, a German fintech payment processing company. This resulted in a lawsuit filed against EY in June 2020. An investigation by the Bundestag revealed in April 2021 that EY's audits of defunct payments group Wirecard suffered from serious shortcomings over a period of years.

EY also failed to identify $300 million in "fabricated sales" in their 2020 audit of the a coffee chain Luckin Coffee and $5 billion in "undisclosed debt" at NMC Health and Finablr.

In August 2021, EY US agreed to pay US$10 million as part of a settlement with the SEC related to charges of auditor independence misconduct perpetrated by several of its partners to secure Sealed Air as a client.

In August 2021, UK accounting regulatory Financial Reporting Council (FRC) fined EY UK £3.5 million (US$4.8 million) for failing to challenge financial statements in its 2017 audit of UK transport company, Stagecoach Group.  In addition, the auditing engagement partner Mark Harvey was sanctioned and fined £100,000.  EY's fine was subsequently cut to £2.2 million for admitting to the failings, with Harvey's fine reduced to £70,000 for the same reason.

In December 2021, EY filed a criminal complaint against unknown persons with Munich prosecutors relating to the alleged leak of a classified German parliamentary report relating to its role in the collapse of payments firm, Wirecard, to the German newspaper, Handelsblatt.

In April 2022 the administrators of NMC Health filed a $2.5 billion lawsuit against EY, alleging negligence during its work on NMC's accounts spanning a seven-year period.

Exam cheating by audit professionals

In June 2022, the SEC fined the firm US$100 million for "for cheating by its audit professionals on exams required to obtain and maintain Certified Public Accountant (CPA) licenses, and for withholding evidence of this misconduct from the SEC's Enforcement Division during the Division's investigation of the matter". EY admitted "the facts underlying the SEC’s charges" and the penalty is a record imposed on a US audit firm. The Canadian Public Accountability Board has announced that it will investigate whether EY's Canadian arm was involved in similar practices.

Investment banking 
In 2009, in the Anglo Irish Bank hidden loans controversy, EY was criticised by politicians and the shareholders of Anglo Irish Bank for failing to detect large loans to Seán FitzPatrick, its chairman, during its audits. The Irish Government had to subsequently take full ownership of the Bank at a cost of €28 billion. The Irish Chartered Accountants Regulatory Board appointed John Purcell to investigate. EY said it "fundamentally disagrees with the decision to initiate a formal disciplinary process" and that "there has been no adverse finding made against EY in respect of the audit of Anglo Irish Bank."

In 2009, EY agreed to pay US$200m out of court to settle a negligence claim by the liquidators of Akai Holdings. Separately the firm was accused of falsifying and doctoring documents it presented to defend against the negligence claim by Akai's liquidators. In a separate lawsuit, a former EY senior partner from 1984 to 1991, Cristopher Ho, and his listed company, Grande Holdings, paid over US$100m to Akai creditors to settle Akai's liquidators' claim that Ho conspired with Ting of stripping assets from Akai. Police raided the Hong Kong office and arrested an EY partner who had been an audit manager on the Akai account from December 1997, although audit documents had been doctored dating back to 1994. Akai was said to be the firm's largest client for most of the 1990s from Hong Kong.
The EY partner for the Akai account between 1991 and 1999, David Sun Tak-kei, faced no charges and went on to become co-managing partner for EY China. A few months later EY settled a similar claim of up to HK$300m from the liquidators of Moulin Global Eyecare, an audit client of the Hong Kong affiliate between 2002 and 2004. The liquidators described the Moulin accounts as a "morass of dodginess".

The Valukas Report issued in 2010 charged that Lehman Brothers engaged in a practice known as repo 105 and that EY, Lehman's auditor, was aware of it. EY was accused of professional malpractice regarding the lack of disclosure of Lehman's repo 105 practice in Lehman's public filings. New York prosecutors announced in 2010 that they have sued the firm. David Goldfarb, a Lehman CFO who concocted the repo 105 balance sheet window dressing technique was a former senior partner of EY. EY said that its last audit of Lehman Brothers was for the fiscal year ending 30 November 2007 and that Lehman's financial statements were fairly presented in accordance with Generally Accepted Accounting Principles. In March 2015, EY settled Lehman-related lawsuits with municipalities in New Jersey and California.

In 2014, tax arrangements negotiated by EY for The Walt Disney Company, Koch Industries, Skype, and other multinational corporations became public in the so-called Luxembourg Leaks. The disclosure of these and other tax arrangements led to controversial discussions about tax avoidance.

EY's member firm in Japan, Ernst & Young ShinNihon, was fined  for failing to spot irregularities during audit of its client Toshiba, which was Japan's worst accounting scandal in years. The firm was also suspended from taking up new business for three months. An official from Japan's Financial Services Agency (FSA) described that "there was a grave breach of duty". The firm's CEO and chairman, Koichi Hanabusa stepped down the following month to take responsibility and monthly salaries for 19 employees were cut from 20 per cent to 50 per cent. In an unusual move, the FSA publicly named seven accountants involved in the audit who were said of failing to exercise due caution and signing off on false financial documents. The FSA also said the "firm’s operations were deeply improper". ShinNihon, at the time, was Japan's biggest accounting firm, with about 3,500 certified accountants and more than 4,000 clients. Ernst & Young ShinNihon audited about 960 listed companies in Japan, the most among the Big Four, as reported in 2015. Ernst & Young ShinNihon had audited Toshiba for over 60 years and the firm had around 70 staff serving Toshiba before the accounting scandal broke.

Ernst & Young Baltic, member of the EY network, used the emission assumptions of highly polluting EURO II trucks (manufactured before 2001) to falsely increase the socio-economic benefits of the new railway for the period 2026–2055 by 3 billion euros in the Rail Baltica Cost-Benefit Analysis. Total mistakes amount to more than 4 billion euros that constitute 20% of the total socio-economic benefits of the Rail Baltica. Correction of the mistakes makes the project unfeasible. EY has refused to provide any comments to the media regarding the public accusations.

Culture

Sexist training program 
In October 2019, HuffPost broke a story about a training seminar purportedly to empower female employees, but which was, as characterized by HuffPost, "full of out of touch advice". Women were told to concentrate on their appearance, not to show too much skin, and not to speak too much. One participant said it was basically a "women bashing" exercise. "You have to offer your thoughts in a benign way...You have to be the perfect Stepford wife... It felt like they were being turned into someone who is super-smiley, who never confronts anyone" she said. In 2021, EY agreed to pay the state of New Jersey $100,000 following its investigation of the sexist "Power-Presence-Purpose" training program.

Working rights 
In April 2021, EY's second-year auditor staff in their Barcelona office sent an email to their line managers to complain about the long hours that they had to work, which were sometimes reaching 84 working hours per week.

Sponsorships 
Ernst & Young is involved in many sponsorships, including its World Entrepreneur of the Year Award program, held in over 60 countries.

Art and media 
EY UK sponsors exhibitions of works by famous artists, such as Cézanne, Picasso, Bonnard, Monet, Rodin and Renoir. The most recent of these was Maharaja: the Splendour of India's Royal Courts at the Victoria and Albert Museum.

In addition, EY sponsors the educational children's show Cyberchase on PBS Kids under the PBS Kids GO! television brand, in an effort to improve mathematics literacy in children.

EY in the UK sponsors the ITEM club.

EY in the UK has set up the National Equality Standard (NES), an initiative developed for business which sets clear equality, diversity and inclusion (EDI) criteria against which companies are assessed. The National Equality Standard (NES) is currently the only industry recognized national standard for EDI in the UK.

EY in the UK has set up EY Foundation, a new UK charity set up to support young people and entrepreneurs.

Sports 
On 8 September 2011, Rio 2016 made the announcement that EY would be an official sponsor of the 2016 Summer Olympics to be held in Brazil, as the exclusive provider of professional services – consulting and auditing – for Rio 2016 organizing committee.

EY was an Official Partner to the 2012 and the 2014 Ryder Cups, it partners with the British and Irish Lions., and it has a longstanding relationship with the 2011 Tour de France winner Cadel Evans.

In April 2019, EY announced a two-year-long collaboration with USA Rugby, where EY would act as their Official Principal Partner. The partnership was focusing on digital and technological transformations, as well as innovating and growing the game in the US, while specifically mentioning an overhaul of USA Rugby's diversity and inclusiveness program.

See also

 Accounting networks and associations
 Big Four accounting firms
 Clarkson Gordon & Co (Canada)

References

External links

 

 

1849 establishments in England
Accounting firms of the United Kingdom
Companies based in London
Consulting firms established in 1849
Financial services companies established in 1849
Financial technology companies
International management consulting firms
Management consulting firms of the United Kingdom
Outsourcing companies
Privately held companies of the United Kingdom
Accounting firms of Canada
Accounting firms of the United States